Swastika is a symbol with an equilateral cross, with four (or a multiple of four) arms bent at 90 degrees.

Swastika may also refer to:

Places

United States
 Brilliant, New Mexico, an unincorporated community formerly named Swastika
 Fish Lake, Minnesota, an unincorporated community formerly named Swastika Beach
 Swastika, New York, an unincorporated community
 Swastika Lake, Wyoming
 Swastika Mountain, Oregon

Elsewhere
 Swastika, Ontario, a community in Kirkland Lake, Ontario, Canada
 Swastika railway station, railway station in Canada
 Swastika Trail, a controversial street name in Puslinch, Ontario
 Swastika Stone, a stone with a swastika in West Yorkshire, England
 Swastik High School, Ahmedabad, Gujarat, India

People
 Swastika Dutta (born 1994), Indian actress
 Swastika Mukherjee (born 1980), Indian actress
 Swastik Samal (born 2000), Indian cricketer
 Alia Swastika (born 1980), Jakarta-based curator and writer

Sports teams
 Cañon City Swastikas, a member of the short-lived minor league baseball Rocky Mountain League in 1912
 Fernie Swastikas, a Canadian women's ice hockey team in Fernie, British Columbia, from 1922 to 1926
 Windsor Swastikas, a Canadian men's ice hockey team in Windsor, Nova Scotia, from 1905 to 1916

Other uses
 Swastika (Germanic Iron Age), a Germanic pagan symbol
 Swastika (film), a British documentary film by Philippe Mora
 Swastika curve, a quartic plane curve
 Swastika epidemic of 1959–1960, a wave of anti-Jewish incidents that happened at the end of 1959 to 1960
 Swastika Eyes, a song by the Scottish rock band Primal Scream
 Swastika Laundry, a former laundry in Ireland
 Swastika Night, a novel by British writer Katharine Burdekin
 Swastik Productions, Indian television and film production company
 Swastik Rangoli Kalakar Group, Indian art collective
 Swastik Sanket, 2022 Indian historical fiction film by Sayantan Ghosal about Subhas Chandra Bose and Nazi Germany
 Red Swastik, 2007 Indian erotic thriller film by Vinod Pande

See also
 Swasika (born 1992), Indian film actress
 Western use of the swastika in the early 20th century
 Zwastika